Estonian Australians refers to Australian citizens of Estonian descent or Estonia-born persons who reside in Australia. According to the 2011 Census, there were 8,551 people of Estonian descent in Australia and 1,928 Estonia-born people residing in the country at the moment of the census, having a fall of 0.4 per cent compared to the 2006 Census. The largest Estonia-born community in Australia is in the state of New South Wales, with 731 people.

From 1940 to 1944, more than 70,000 Estonians fled to the West due to the Soviet and German occupations. Many settled in Australia. The first voyage under Arthur Calwell's Displaced Persons immigration program, that of the USS General Stuart Heintzelman in 1947, was specially chosen to be all from Baltic nations, all single, many blond and blue-eyed, in order to appeal to the Australian public. Of the 843 immigrants on the Heintzelman, 142 were Estonian.

Notable people
 Anna Murdoch Mann, second wife of Rupert Murdoch
 Armin Öpik, geologist
 Arvi Parbo, chairman of BHP
 Vicki Viidikas, poet
 Dane Rampe, AFL player for the Sydney Swans
 Erik Paartalu, professional footballer
 Anna Torv, actress

See also

Australia–Estonia relations
Europeans in Oceania
European Australians
Immigration to Australia
Estonian Canadians
Estonian Americans

External links
 estonia.org.au - Connecting Australia with Estonians
 Estonian Archives in Australia

References